Wilhelm "Willi" Freuwörth (4 November 1917 – 5 December 1970) was a Luftwaffe ace and recipient of the Knight's Cross of the Iron Cross during World War II. The Knight's Cross of the Iron Cross was awarded to recognise extreme battlefield bravery or successful military leadership.  During his career Wilhelm Freuwörth was credited with 58 aerial victories.

War against the Soviet Union

On 22 June, German forces had launched Operation Barbarossa, the invasion of the Soviet Union. Pror to its deployment on the Eastern Front, I. Gruppe was fully equipped with the Messerschmitt Bf 109 F-2. The Gruppe reached Orsha on 27 September before heading to Ponyatovka on 2 October. There, the Gruppe was initially subordinated to the Stab (headquarters unit) of Jagdgeschwader 27 (JG 27—27th Fighter Wing) and supported German forces fighting in the Battle of Vyazma  as part of Operation Typhoon, the code name of the German offensive on Moscow. While transferring to Ruza, Freuwörth belly landed his Bf 109 F-2 at Smolensk on 4 October.

On 29 May 1942, Freuwörth was shot down in his Bf 109 F-4 during aerial combat with I-61 fighters, an early German designation of the Mikoyan-Gurevich MiG-3 fighter. Freuwörth was awarded the Knight's Cross of the Iron Cross on 5 January 1943.

On 24 March 1943, Freuwörth and his wingman Unteroffizier Peter Crump intercepted two Supermarine Spitfire from No. 91 Squadron. Both Spitfires were claimed shot down. Freuwörth hit the Spitfire piloted by Flying Officer Jim Anstie, resulting in a forced landing near RAF Lympne. According to Mathews and Foreman, the aircraft he shot down was a misidentified Hawker Typhoon fighter from the No. 609 Squadron piloted by John Robert Baldwin who was shot down over the English Channel that day. On 1 January 1945, Freuwörth was promoted to Oberleutnant (first lieutenant).

Summary of career

Aerial victory claims
According to US historian David T. Zabecki, Freuwörth was credited with 58 aerial victories. Mathews and Foreman, authors of Luftwaffe Aces — Biographies and Victory Claims, researched the German Federal Archives and found records for 48 aerial victory claims. This figure includes 45 aerial victories on the Eastern Front and three over the Western Allies.

Victory claims were logged to a map-reference (PQ = Planquadrat), for example "PQ 40412". These sectors were then subdivided into 36 smaller units to give a location area 3 × 4 km in size.

Awards
 Honour Goblet of the Luftwaffe on 19 October 1942 as Unteroffizier and pilot
 German Cross in Gold on 17 November 1942 as Unteroffizier in the I./Jagdgeschwader 52
 Knight's Cross of the Iron Cross on 5 January 1943 as Feldwebel and pilot in the 2./Jagdgeschwader 52

Notes

References

Citations

Bibliography

External links
TracesOfWar.com

1917 births
1970 deaths
People from Wolfenbüttel (district)
Luftwaffe pilots
German World War II flying aces
Recipients of the Gold German Cross
Recipients of the Knight's Cross of the Iron Cross
Military personnel from Lower Saxony